Badminton has been part of the Arab Games since 1999 in Amman, Jordan. Syria tops the medal table, having won 15 gold medals, 3 silvers and 3 bronze medals. Algeria won four golds and two silvers while Egypt won a gold, three silvers and six bronzes. Sudan won its first medal in badminton at the 2007 Pan Arab Games.

Badminton was later discontinued from the Games in 2011.

Previous winners

Medal table

Results

2007 Pan Arab Games

Medalists

Team event

References
https://web.archive.org/web/20120425091614/http://www.africa-badminton.com/DOSSIERJEUX/pagespeciale11jeuxegypte.htm
https://web.archive.org/web/20161218024452/http://www.radioalgerie.dz/fr/index.php?option=com_content&view=article&id=15358

 
Sports at the Pan Arab Games
Pan Arab Games